The Guabá River is a river of Las Marías, Puerto Rico. It goes through Maricao as well.

See also
List of rivers of Puerto Rico

References

External links
 USGS Hydrologic Unit Map – Caribbean Region (1974)
 Rios de Puerto Rico

Rivers of Puerto Rico